Orcula zilchi is a species of small air-breathing land snail, a terrestrial pulmonate gastropod mollusk in the family Orculidae. This species is known from the type locality in Bulgaria and three localities in Turkey.

References

Orcula
Gastropods described in 1960